The State of Indiana school voucher movement known as Indiana Choice Scholarships was created in order to address the failings in the public education system. It is the largest school voucher program in the U.S.

The movement to offer school vouchers was promoted as a way to allow underprivileged students stuck in underachieving schools the opportunity to attend a private school.  The plan has been both hailed and criticized as either the new dawn of education or the beginning of the end of public education in America.

History
In 2011 the initial school voucher program in Indiana passed while Mitch Daniels was governor. In 2013 the Indiana General Assembly passed HB 1003, which amended the school voucher program by creating tax credits for those already enrolled in private school and expanding voucher eligibility. Mike Pence was governor and supported the changes.

Proponents of vouchers

Those who support the voucher program point to the exponential growth of the program. In the 2011–12 school year 9,324 students were enrolled in the states voucher program making it one of the largest in the country.

Opponents of vouchers

While a choice in school may be favored by many, there are those who do not like the idea. Supporters of public schools say the program undermines the foundation of the public school system. They also point to the irony that schools are expected to fix their shortfalls while losing money from the students who depart for private schools.

References

Schools in Indiana